{{safesubst:#invoke:RfD||2=SolidGoldMagikarp|month = March
|day =  2
|year = 2023
|time = 14:22
|timestamp = 20230302142243

|content=
REDIRECT ChatGPT

}}